Steve Dowman (born 15 April 1958 in Ilford) is a former professional footballer who played in the Football League as a central defender.

Career
Born in Manor Park, Dowman began his career at Colchester United, making 154 league appearances and scoring 21 goals. He then moved on to play for Wrexham, Charlton Athletic, Newport County and Cambridge United, before dropping into non-league football.

As a teenager, Dowman was considered an outstanding prospect and picked (along with his partner in central defense, Lindsay Smith) as part of the PFA 4th division team of the year. Particularly strong in the air, he scored so many goals moving forward for free kicks and corners that Colchester tried him as a centre forward before letting him to revert to his natural position.

Honours

Individual
 PFA Team of the Year (1): 1976–77
 Colchester United Player of the Year (1): 1977

References

External links
 

1958 births
Living people
Footballers from Ilford
English footballers
Association football defenders
Colchester United F.C. players
Wrexham A.F.C. players
Charlton Athletic F.C. players
Newport County A.F.C. players
Cambridge United F.C. players
Brightlingsea Regent F.C. players
Brightlingsea Regent F.C. managers
English Football League players
English football managers